Kaluzhsky (masculine), Kaluzhskaya (feminine), or Kaluzhskoye (neuter) is the name of several rural localities in Russia:
Kaluzhskoye, Kaliningrad Oblast, a settlement in Kaluzhsky Rural Okrug of Chernyakhovsky District of Kaliningrad Oblast
Kaluzhskoye, Moscow Oblast, a village in Drovninskoye Rural Settlement of Mozhaysky District of Moscow Oblast
Kaluzhskaya (rural locality), a stanitsa in Kaluzhsky Rural Okrug of Seversky District of Krasnodar Krai